The World Beyond the Hill: Science Fiction and the Quest for Transcendence (1989) is a book about the history of science fiction, written by Alexei Panshin and Cory Panshin.

Publication
It was first published in hardcover by Jeremy P. Tarcher in August 1989 in a limited signed and numbered edition of 500 copies; a broader hardcover edition for general release and a trade paperback edition followed from the same publisher in the same year. An ebook edition was issued by ElectricStory.com in December 2002, and a new hardcover edition by Phoenix Pick in April 2010.

Scope
It took the Panshins about ten years to research and write, though they had made earlier attempts at writing a book on the genre.
The book considers the evolution of science fiction from Horace Walpole's 1764 fantasy, The Castle of Otranto to modern science fiction writers through the middle of the twentieth century.

Reception
The book received wide critical acclaim and won the 1990 Hugo Award for Best Non-Fiction Book.

Notes

External links 
The Abyss of Wonder Alexei Panshin's web site
Trogholm Cory Panshin's web site

1989 non-fiction books
Science fiction studies
Hugo Award for Best Non-Fiction Book winning works
Books of literary criticism
TarcherPerigee books